Lipnica is a village located in the municipality of Knić, central Serbia. As of 2011 census, it has a population of 459 inhabitants.

References

Populated places in Šumadija District